Acacia lineolata, commonly known as dwarf myall, is a shrub of the genus Acacia and the subgenus Plurinerves that is endemic to an area of south western Australia.

Description
Like most species of Acacia it has phyllodes rather than true leaves. It blooms from June to September and produces yellow flowers.

Taxonomy
The species belongs to the Acacia enervia group of wattles.

There are two recognised subspecies:
 Acacia lineolata subsp. lineolata
 Acacia lineolata subsp. multilineata

Distribution
It is native to an area in the Wheatbelt, Great Southern and Goldfields-Esperance regions of Western Australia where it is commonly situated on sandplains, saline flats and low lying areas growing in rocky clay, saline loam or sandy soils. The range of the shrub extends from around Yuna in the north west to around Pingrup in the south east.

See also
List of Acacia species

References

lineolata
Acacias of Western Australia
Taxa named by George Bentham
Plants described in 1855